WTIU, virtual channel 30 (UHF digital channel 33), is a Public Broadcasting Service (PBS) member television station serving Indianapolis, Indiana, United States that is licensed to Bloomington. Owned by Indiana University, it is a sister station to National Public Radio (NPR) member WFIU (103.7 FM). The two stations share studios on the Indiana University campus on East 7th Street in Bloomington; WTIU's transmitter is located on Sare Road on the city's southeast side.

On cable, WTIU is available on Comcast Xfinity channel 5 in Bloomington in AT&T U-verse channel 30 in Indianapolis in standard definition, and in high definition on Xfinity digital channel 1022 in Bloomington and AT&T U-verse channel 1030 in Indianapolis.

The station also serves as the default PBS member station for the Terre Haute market, despite having WVUT (channel 22) in Vincennes from the Vincennes University. It is carried by most cable providers in west-central Indiana.

History

In late 1968, after receiving support from University president Herman B. Wells, Indiana University applied for a license from the Federal Communications Commission (FCC) to operate an educational television station. The station first signed on the air on March 3, 1969 as a member station of National Educational Television (NET); the first program ever broadcast on WTIU was The Friendly Giant, a Canadian-produced children's show. WTIU became a member of PBS when NET was reorganized on October 6, 1970.

Channel 30 originally maintained a very small staff of only three employees, and initially broadcast on Mondays through Saturdays for five hours a day during the afternoon hours. As the station was unable to afford equipment to allow programming to be transmitted in color, much of the programming broadcast by WTIU was aired in black and white in the early years. Through PBS' Program Differentiation Plan, the network's programming was eventually divided between it and three other PBS members in the Indianapolis market – WFYI (channel 20), Muncie-based WIPB (channel 49) and by 1992, WTBU (channel 69, now Daystar owned-and-operated station WDTI).

Digital television

Digital channels
The station's digital signal is multiplexed:

In 2009, WTIU upgraded the station's primary digital channel to allow the transmission of programming in high definition, originally maintaining a schedule separate from that of WTIU's main channel. The station also launched a secondary service on digital subchannel 30.2, branded as "TIU-2," which primarily aired educational programming and college telecourses; the subchannel was converted into  "TIU World," serving as an affiliate of PBS World in 2010. At the same time, WTIU added two additional subchannels, respectively carrying programming from the lifestyle and how-to service Create (branded as "TIU Create"), safety and emergency network Echo (branded as "TIU Echo") and the respectively carrying programming from the children's service PBS Kids (branded as "TIU Kids").

Analog-to-digital conversion
WTIU began operating its digital signal in 2007, broadcasting on UHF channel 14. WTIU shut down its analog signal, over UHF channel 30, on June 12, 2009, the official date in which full-power television in the United States transitioned from analog to digital broadcasts under federal mandate. The station's digital signal continued to broadcast on its pre-transition UHF channel 14. Through the use of PSIP, digital television receivers display the station's virtual channel as its former UHF analog channel 30.

Programming
WTIU's flagship original production is the public and cultural affairs program The Weekly Special, in production since 2005. The Friday Zone, in production since 1999, is a children's program syndicated on seven PBS stations across Indiana. WTIU also regularly produces documentaries, typically focusing on local or regional topics. Documentary series produced by the station have included Our Town (which focus on a single community's culture and history) and The Spirit of Monroe County (which focuses on the people and places of interest in Monroe County). WTIU also produces news updates in the form of twice-daily five-minute NewsBreak segments as well as the half-hour weekly newsmagazine Indiana Newsdesk. In 1973, WTIU collaborated with the IU Opera Theater to produce a telecast of the opera Myshkin, which earned the station a Peabody Award.

References

External links

Official website
The Weekly Special website

Indiana University
Television channels and stations established in 1969
TIU
1969 establishments in Indiana